Baykar is a private Turkish defence company specialising in  UAVs, C4I and artificial intelligence.

Name 
Baykar is a portmanteau of the words Bayraktar Kardeşler. The company presently operates under the names "Baykar Teknoloji" and "Baykar Makina Sanayi ve Ticaret A.Ş."

History
The company was founded in 1984 as Baykar Makina, a CNC precision machining supplier subcontractor by Özdemir Bayraktar, with the primary goals being production of automotive parts such as engines, pumps and spare parts to ensure the localization of the automotive industry. Established in this direction, Baykar is an engineering company founded with 100% domestic capital. It took steps towards producing unmanned aerial vehicles in the 2000s in line with the developments and progress in the aviation sector. Bayraktar Mini UAV was the first unmanned aerial system produced entirely with domestic capital, included in the Turkish Armed Forces inventory in 2007. Having launched R&D activities for this purpose, Baykar has realized pioneering productions in its field and by producing subsystems, it has achieved to provide technical support to Turkish national defence industry, as the latter has grown and started exporting weapons including Baykar drones. Baykar's portfolio of advanced UAVs includes Bayraktar Tactical UAS (Bayraktar TB1), Bayraktar TB2 UCAV, Bayraktar Akıncı UCAV. It is also developing a flying car (quadricopter) which it started testing in 2020. The car, called Cezeri and weighing 230 kilograms, rose 10 metres above the ground in the tests carried out in Istanbul in September 2020.

In 2021, the Ukrainian military for the first time in the War in Donbas used a Bayraktar strike drone, Bayraktar TB2.

In June 2022, the "People's Bayraktar" fundraising project was launched in Ukraine, which managed to fundraise in three over UAH 600 million to purchase three Bayraktar TB2.

Key people
The company has been  led by Özdemir Bayraktar until his death and his sons - Selçuk and Haluk

Özdemir Bayraktar
Baykar's Senior Mechanical Engineer and Chairman of the Board Özdemir Bayraktar, graduated from Istanbul Technical University's Department of Mechanical Engineering in 1972. He then completed a master's degree at the Department of Engines, with a focus on internal combustion engines. He had positions in many companies that played a leading role in Turkey's industrial sector (Burdur Tractors, Istanbul Retaining Ring Uzel, etc.). In 1984, he took part in the establishment of Baykar Makina to indigenize what was then Turkey's highly import-dependent automotive industry. At Baykar, he directed many unique machining and manufacturing apparatus design processes for the precision machining sector. In 2004, he decided to move on to UAV production with his son Selçuk, who at the time was pursuing a Ph.D. degree on unmanned aerial systems at MIT. He then started to play a pioneering role in Baykar's development of indigenous Unmanned Aerial Vehicle technology, implementing these projects from design to prototype, and subsequently from manufacturing stages to further R&D. He also had a private pilot's license.
According to opposition Cumhuriyet newspaper, he had a religiously conservative background, but despite disdainful relations at the time between pious groups and the army, he had ties with several military figures and worked on Turkish Armed Forces projects in the late 1990s. He was awarded the Order of Karabakh by Azerbaijani President Ilham Aliyev in April 2021 for his "contribution to the liberation of Karabakh from the occupation of Armenia" by Bayraktar TB2 drones. He died on 18 October 2021 at the age of 72 in Istanbul.

Selçuk Bayraktar 
Baykar's Chief Technical Officer, Selçuk Bayraktar, was born in 1979 in Istanbul. After attending the prestigious Robert College high school, Selcuk Bayraktar studied electrical engineering at Istanbul Technical University, graduating in 2002. He then pursued an internship at University of Pennsylvania,  later obtaining a master's degree in engineering from the same university. Bayraktar went on to study for a Ph.D. degree at the Massachusetts Institute of Technology (MIT), where he worked on unmanned helicopter systems. He completed his master's at MIT in 2006 with a thesis titled Aggressive landing maneuvers for unmanned aerial vehicles He returned to Turkey in 2007 cutting his Ph.D. studies short to work at Baykar. Bayraktar called on Turkish officials to invest in drone technology in 2005. “If Turkey supports this project, these drones, then in five years it can easily be at the forefront of the world in this field” Bayraktar said in 2005. He has been hailed as a pioneer of what Turkish President Recep Tayyip Erdoğan calls Ankara's rapidly developing “local and national” defence sector. Bayraktar married Erdoğan's daughter Sümeyye in 2016.

Haluk Bayraktar
Baykar's CEO and general manager, Haluk Bayraktar, has received an undergraduate degree from METU Industrial Engineering in 2000 and completed his master's degree in the same field at Columbia University in 2002. In 2004, he started his doctoral studies in Business Administration at Boğaziçi University. In the same period, he worked as an engineer manager in the project design stages of the works for the development of National and Unique Unmanned Aerial Vehicle Systems within the family company, involved in conceptual design, prototype, testing, production, training and business stages. In 2018, he was elected as the chairman of the Board of SAHA Istanbul Defense and Aviation Cluster and a member of the TUBITAK Board of Directors in 2018.

Products 

 Baykar Bayraktar Mini UAV
 Baykar Bayraktar TB1
 Baykar Bayraktar TB2
 Baykar Bayraktar Akıncı
 Baykar Bayraktar TB3
 Baykar Bayraktar Kızılelma
 Bayraktar VTOL

International boycott 
Baykar's drones have been used in 2020 Nagorno-Karabakh war by the Azerbaijani army which resulted in a series of boycotts from international companies whom Baykar used to buy products from. Domestic drone manufacturing before that war relied on imported and regulated components and technologies such as the engines from Austria (manufactured by Rotax), fuel systems (manufactured by Andair) and missile rack (manufactured by EDO MBM) from the UK, optoelectronics (FLIR sensors imported from Wescam in Canada or Hensoldt in Germany). Engines exports were halted when Canadian Bombardier, owner of Rotax, became aware of the military use of their recreational aircraft engines. In October 2020 Canadian Wescam (optics and sensors) exports were restricted by the Canadian Foreign Ministry. After learning that their products were utilised to create combat drones, Hampshire-based UK aircraft manufacturer Andair announced the discontinuation of all sales to Baykar Makina on 11 January 2020. The British  manufacturer became the latest company to stop selling equipment to Turkey after its components were found in drones shot down during the Nagorno-Karabakh war.

Turkish industry responded to foreign sales boycotts by announcing provision of domestically manufactured alternatives to Baykar - PD170 motor (Turkish Aerospace Industries), optical camera (Aselsan CATS system), and fuel valve (Aselsan). Turkish defense industry researcher Kadir Doğan tweeted that cancellation of sales of components to Baykar by foreign companies did not pose a major problem, and that as of January 2021 all those components have been replaced by locally manufactured alternatives.

References

Gallery

External links
 Baykar Tech

Unmanned aerial vehicle manufacturers of Turkey
Defence companies of Turkey
Aircraft manufacturers of Turkey
Aerospace companies of Asia
Aerospace companies of Europe
Manufacturing companies based in Istanbul